The 1997–98 Irish League Cup (known as the Wilkinson Sword League Cup for sponsorship reasons) was the 12th edition of Northern Ireland's secondary football knock-out cup competition. It concluded on 9 September 1997 with the final.

Crusaders were the defending champions after their first League Cup win last season; a 1–0 victory over Glentoran in the previous final. This season they went out in the quarter-finals to eventual winners Linfield, who lifted their fourth League Cup with a 1–0 victory over arch-rivals Glentoran in the final, condemning the Glens to their second successive League Cup final defeat.

This was the last competition to feature clubs from the Irish League B Division. From the following season onwards, the competition would only be open to senior clubs in the top two divisions.

First round

|}
1 Larne were disqualified for fielding an ineligible player. Cookstown United were reinstated.

Second round

|}

Quarter-finals

|}

Semi-finals

|}

Final

References

Lea
1997–98 domestic association football cups
1997-98